1977 was a year.

1977 may also refer to:
 1977 (Ana Tijoux album), the fifth studio album by Latin hip hop artist Ana Tijoux
 1977 (Ash album), the first official album by Ash
 1977 (The-Dream album), an album by American R&B recording artist The-Dream
 1977 (film), a Tamil language film released in 2009
 "1977" (song), a song by the English punk rock band The Clash
 1977 (band), a Canadian indie pop band